Suka may refer to:

 Suka (string instrument)
 Sukaa, the Nepalese currency unit
 Shuka (Shukadeva), the Hindu sage
 Suka Station
 suka, a Polish profanity
 Сука, a Russian profanity

See also 
 Sukkah

Polish profanity